Tanjakot is a rural municipality located in Humla District of Karnali Province of Nepal.

The rural municipality is divided into total 5 wards and the headquarters of the rural municipality is situated at Maila.

Demographics
At the time of the 2011 Nepal census, 99.7% of the population in Tanjakot Rural Municipality spoke Nepali and 0.2% Tamang as their first language; 0.1% spoke other languages.

In terms of ethnicity/caste, 36.1% were Chhetri, 18.8% Hill Brahmin, 14.3% Thakuri, 9.3% Damai/Dholi, 8.7% Kami, 5.6% Byasi/Sauka, 4.7% Sarki, 1.9% Teli and 0.6% others.

In terms of religion, 94.1% were Hindu, 5.8% Buddhist and 0.1% Christian.

References

External links
 Official website

Populated places in Humla District
Rural municipalities in Karnali Province
Rural municipalities of Nepal established in 2017